Ravi Kant (born 14 September 1956) is a professor of Surgery at Sharda University, who was the director of the All India Institute of Medical Sciences, Rishikesh from 2017 to 2021 and the Vice Chancellor of King George's Medical University from 2014 to 2017. Earlier he was head of surgery at All India Institute of Medical Sciences in Bhopal and faculty at Maulana Azad Medical College in New Delhi. The Government of India awarded him the Padma Shri in 2016.

Awards
 Dr. B. C. Roy Award by the Medical Council of India
 Yash Bharti Award by the Government of Uttar Pradesh
 Padma Shri by the President of India

References

External links

Living people
Recipients of the Padma Shri in medicine
Heads of universities and colleges in India
1956 births
Academic staff of Delhi University
Fellows of the Royal College of Surgeons
King George's Medical University alumni
University of Lucknow alumni
Fellows of the Royal College of Surgeons of Edinburgh
Fellows of the Royal College of Surgeons in Ireland
20th-century Indian medical doctors
People from Faizabad
Medical doctors from Uttar Pradesh
Dr. B. C. Roy Award winners
20th-century surgeons